Bělá is a municipality and village in Havlíčkův Brod District in the Vysočina Region of the Czech Republic. It has about 200 inhabitants.

Administrative parts
The village of Tasice is an administrative part of Bělá.

References

Villages in Havlíčkův Brod District